Angelo Nicolini (1505–1567) was an Italian Roman Catholic bishop and cardinal. He began his career as a politician and lawyer and entered the priesthood after his wife died. He was named cardinal by Pope Pius IV and participated in the election of his successor, Pope Pius V.

Biography

Angelo Nicolini was born in Florence in 1505, the son of Matteo Nicolini. He attended the University of Pisa, becoming a doctor of both laws in 1523.  In 1530, he married Alessandra di Vincenzo Ugolini; the couple had four children before his wife's death in 1550.  He was a counselor to Cosimo I de' Medici, Grand Duke of Tuscany, who entrusted him with many important missions and made him a senator.  He was the ambassador of Duchy of Florence to the court of Pope Paul III, and then, in 1538, to Charles V, Holy Roman Emperor.  He became governor of Siena in 1557.

After his wife's death, he entered the service of the church, becoming a priest.  On 14 July 1564 he was elected Archbishop of Pisa.

Pope Pius IV made him a cardinal priest in the consistory of 12 March 1565.  He received the red hat and the titular church of San Callisto on 15 May 1565.  He participated in the papal conclave of 1565-66 that elected Pope Pius V.

He died in Siena on 15 August 1567.  He was buried in the Basilica of Santa Croce, Florence.

See also

References

1505 births
1567 deaths
16th-century Italian cardinals
Ambassadors of the Republic of Florence
16th-century people of the Republic of Florence
16th-century Italian diplomats